Asad Jahangir Khan (born 25 December 1945) is a former first-class cricketer and senior police officer in Pakistan.

Cricket career
The son of Jahangir Khan and the elder brother of Majid Khan, Asad Jahangir Khan made his first-class debut in the 1964–65 season while studying at the University of the Punjab. He went to Keble College, Oxford in 1966, and played for the university team from 1967 to 1969. His best season was 1968, when he took 41 wickets with his off-spin in 14 matches, at an average of 28.80.

Playing for an Oxford and Cambridge XI against the touring Australians in May 1968, he took 7 for 84, including the wickets of Bill Lawry, Ian Chappell and Bob Cowper. Earlier that month he had taken 5 for 44 against Warwickshire, including the wickets of Rohan Kanhai and John Jameson. In the next match, opening the batting with Fred Goldstein against Somerset, he made 50 not out in an unbroken partnership of 148.

In 1969 his bowling fell away (three wickets in six matches) but he made 280 runs at 31.11, including his highest score of 92 against D.H. Robins' XI. A week earlier he had made 81 not out against Kent to take Oxford to a one-wicket victory with a ball to spare.

He returned to Pakistan and played a few matches for Lahore cricket teams in 1969–70 and 1970–71. His last first-class match was a semi-final of the Quaid-e-Azam Trophy in February 1971, when, playing for Lahore Greens, he took 3 for 157 off 52 overs against Karachi Blues.

Police career
He worked as a police officer, specialising in traffic policing, and became Inspector-General of Police in Sindh Province. He is now retired.

References

External links
 

1945 births
Living people
Pakistani cricketers
Lahore cricketers
Punjab University cricketers
Oxford University cricketers
Cricketers from Attock
Pakistani police chiefs
University of the Punjab alumni
Alumni of Keble College, Oxford
Asad Jahangir
Pashtun people
Oxford and Cambridge Universities cricketers